Uuvudhiya is a populated place in the Oshana Region in northern Namibia. It is the district capital of the Uuvudhiya electoral constituency.

The settlement reported a water supply problem in 2003, according to the regional councillor Amutenya Ndahafa.  Juliane Zeidler of LakeNet reported that deforestation was also a problem.

References

Populated places in the Oshana Region